Itis (formerly Itäkeskus) is the second largest shopping centre in Finland, located in Itäkeskus in East Helsinki. It is located next to the Itäväylä motorway and the Itäkeskus metro station. The mall has 3,000 parking spaces and approximately 18 million visitors annually. Its anchor tenants are Stockmann, S-market, Lidl, Halonen, Tokmanni and H&M.

The shopping centre is divided into four sections: Pasaasi (1984), Pikku-Bulevardi, Bulevardi (1992), and Piazza (2001). It has five floors, with the shops and other commercial services mainly concentrated on the first and second floors. The other floors are reserved mainly for parking and office space.

The shopping centre was built in three stages. The part now known as Pasaasi was completed in 1984 under the name Itämarket ('eastern market'), complete with the metro station and 41 shops. The new shopping centre proved successful, and an extension with 160 more shops (now Bulevardi and Pikku-Bulevardi) was built by September 1992. Another extension, known as Piazza, was opened in 2001. The following year, the property was sold by its owner Sponda Oyj to the Dutch company Wereldhave NV. Wereldhave sold Itis to the Morgan Stanley Real Estate Investing and CC Real on 2019.

Finnkino opened Finland's first commercial IMAX movie theatre in Itis on 30 November 2018.

See also
 Hertsi
 Tallinnanaukio

References

External links

 

Shopping centres in Helsinki
Shops in Helsinki
Shopping malls established in 1979